The Mercedes-Benz OM612 engine is a straight-5 diesel engine produced by Daimler AG ,today Mercedes-Benz.

It was introduced in 1999 for the 2000 model year in a  version in the W210 E-Class, W211 E-Class, W163 ML-Class, W203 C-Class and W209 CLK-Class in 2000.
Also used in the Austrian built Jeep WG Grand Cherokee (ENF in Jeep catalogues), equivalent to the petrol WJ. On SsangYong models it names D27DT (further DTP) engine or OM665.9xx engine and has another displacement. These models have an index of x270 XDI. 

This remains the only diesel-powered AMG vehicle to date, except for the second generation AMG MB100 van, powered by an AMG modified OM616 or OM617 engine.

The OM612 was a 5-cylinder version of the OM611. A six-cylinder OM613 was also produced.

Technical specifications 

OM612
Diesel engines by model

Straight-five engines